Staphylococcus epidermidis is a Gram-positive bacterium, and one of over 40 species belonging to the genus Staphylococcus. It is part of the normal human microbiota, typically the skin microbiota, and less commonly the mucosal microbiota and also found in marine sponges. It is a facultative anaerobic bacteria.  Although S. epidermidis is not usually pathogenic, patients with compromised immune systems are at risk of developing infection. These infections are generally hospital-acquired.  S. epidermidis is a particular concern for people with catheters or other surgical implants because it is known to form biofilms that grow on these devices.  Being part of the normal skin microbiota, S. epidermidis is a frequent contaminant of specimens sent to the diagnostic laboratory.

Some strains of S. epidermidis are highly salt tolerant and commonly found in marine environment. S.I. Paul et al. (2021) isolated and identified salt tolerant strains of S. epidermidis (strains ISP111A, ISP111B and ISP111C) from Cliona viridis sponges of the Saint Martin's Island Area of the Bay of Bengal, Bangladesh.

Etymology
'Staphylococcus' - bunch of grape-like berries, 'epidermidis' - of the epidermis.

Discovery
Friedrich Julius Rosenbach distinguished S. epidermidis from S. aureus in 1884, initially naming S. epidermidis as S. albus.  He chose aureus and albus since the bacteria formed yellow and white colonies, respectively.

Cellular morphology and biochemistry 

Staphylococcus epidermidis is a very hardy microorganism, consisting of nonmotile, Gram-positive cocci, arranged in grape-like clusters. It forms white, raised, cohesive colonies about 1–2 mm in diameter after overnight incubation, and is not hemolytic on blood agar. It is a catalase-positive, coagulase-negative, facultative anaerobe that can grow by aerobic respiration or by fermentation. Some strains may not ferment.

Biochemical tests indicate this microorganism also carries out a weakly positive reaction to the nitrate reductase test. It is positive for urease production, is oxidase negative, and can use glucose, sucrose, and lactose to form acid products. In the presence of lactose, it will also produce gas. Nonpathogenic S. epidermidis unlike pathogenic S. aureus does not possess the gelatinase enzyme, so it cannot hydrolyze gelatin.  It is sensitive to novobiocin, providing an important test to distinguish it from Staphylococcus saprophyticus, which is coagulase-negative, as well, but novobiocin-resistant.

Similar to those of S. aureus, the cell walls of S. epidermidis have a transferrin-binding protein that helps the organism obtain iron from transferrin. The tetramers of a surface exposed protein, glyceraldehyde-3-phosphate dehydrogenase, are believed to bind to transferrin and remove its iron. Subsequent steps include iron being transferred to surface lipoproteins, then to transport proteins which carry the iron into the cell.

Biochemical characteristics of Staphylococcus epidermidis 
Colony, morphological, physiological, and biochemical characteristics of marine S. epidermidis are shown in the table below.

Note: + = Positive, – =Negative, W= Weakly Positive

Virulence and antibiotic resistance
The ability to form biofilms on plastic devices is a major virulence factor for S. epidermidis. One probable cause is surface proteins that bind blood and extracellular matrix proteins.
It produces an extracellular material known as polysaccharide intercellular adhesin (PIA), which is made up of sulfated polysaccharides.  It allows other bacteria to bind to the already existing biofilm, creating a multilayer biofilm.
Such biofilms decrease the metabolic activity of bacteria within them. This decreased metabolism, in combination with impaired diffusion of antibiotics, makes it difficult for antibiotics to effectively clear this type of infection.
S. epidermidis strains are often resistant to antibiotics, including rifamycin, fluoroquinolones, gentamicin, tetracycline, clindamycin, and sulfonamides. Methicillin resistance is particularly widespread, with 75-90% of hospital isolates resistance to methicillin. Resistant organisms are most commonly found in the intestine, but organisms living freely on the skin can also become resistant due to routine exposure to antibiotics secreted in sweat.

Disease 

As mentioned above, S. epidermidis causes biofilms to grow on plastic devices placed within the body. This occurs most commonly on intravenous catheters and on medical prostheses. Infection can also occur in dialysis patients or anyone with an implanted plastic device that may have been contaminated. It also causes endocarditis, most often in patients with defective heart valves. In some other cases, sepsis can occur in hospital patients. 

Antibiotics are largely ineffective in clearing biofilms.  The most common treatment for these infections is to remove or replace the infected implant, though in all cases, prevention is ideal. The drug of choice is often vancomycin, to which rifampin or an aminoglycoside can be added. Hand washing has been shown to reduce the spread of infection.

Preliminary research also indicates S. epidermidis is universally found inside affected acne vulgaris pores, where Cutibacterium acnes is normally the sole resident.

The role of Staphylococcus epidermidis in acne vulgaris 
Staphylococcus epidermidis in the normal skin is nonpathogenic. But in abnormal lesions, it becomes pathogenic, likely in acne vulgaris. Staphylococcus epidermidis enters the sebaceous gland (colonized by Propionibacterium acnes, the main bacterium that causes acne vulgaris) and damages the hair follicles by producing lipolytic enzymes that change the sebum from fraction to dense (thick) form leading to inflammatory effect.

Moreover, S. epidermidis biofilm formation by releasing the exopolysaccharide intercellular adhesion (PIA) provides the susceptible anaerobic environment to P. acnes colonisation and protects it from the innate human immunity molecules.

Both P. acnes and S. epidermidis can interact to protect the host skin health from pathogens colonisation. But in the case of competition, they use the same carbon source (i.e. glycerol) to produce short chain fatty acids which act as antibacterial agent against each other. Also, S. epidermidis helps in skin homeostasis and reduces the P. acnes pathogenic inflammation by decreasing the TLR2 protein production that induces the skin inflammation.

Identification 
The normal practice of detecting S. epidermidis is by using appearance of colonies on selective media, bacterial morphology by light microscopy, catalase and slide coagulase testing. Zobell agar is useful for the isolation of Staphylococcus epidermidis from marine organisms. On the Baird-Parker agar with egg yolk supplement, colonies appear small and black. Increasingly, techniques such as quantitative PCR are being employed for the rapid detection and identification of Staphylococcus strains. Normally, sensitivity to desferrioxamine can also be used to distinguish it from most other staphylococci, except in the case of Staphylococcus hominis, which is also sensitive. In this case, the production of acid from trehalose by S. hominis can be used to tell the two species apart.

See also
 Biofilms
 Microbiology
 Staphylococcus

Notes and references

Further reading

External links
 Type strain of Staphylococcus epidermidis at BacDive -  the Bacterial Diversity Metadatabase

epidermidis
Gram-positive bacteria
Bacteria described in 1908